Hema maps is an Australian based mapping, navigation and publishing company. Their company headquarters is located at Eight Mile Plains, Brisbane, Queensland. Hema maps is a private limited company with shareholders.

The company name Hema was decided upon by incorporating the first two letters of the names of the company’s founders – Henry and Margaret Boegheim. Rob Boegheim replaced company founders Henry and Margaret Boegheim as Managing Director in 2007.

History 
Originally titled Hema Charts & Laminating, the business began as a laminating business that sold marine charts via bait and tackle shops throughout South East Queensland in 1983. The company’s first creation was a map of Rockhampton.

Hema released their first Hema Navigator, the HN1, in 2008 which was Australia’s very first portable navigation system for use both on and off-road

References

External links 
 Official website

Publishing companies of Australia
Companies based in Queensland
Map publishing companies
1983 establishments in Australia